A suicide bombing of Egged bus #14a took place in Jerusalem on February 22, 2004. Eight passengers were killed in the attack and over 60 people were injured, many of them children on their way to school. The Al-Aqsa Martyrs' Brigades claimed responsibility for the attack.

The attack 
On Sunday, February 22, 2004, during the morning rush hour, a Palestinian suicide bomber got on the 14a  bus traveling to  downtown Jerusalem. The suicide bomber had an explosive device hidden in a backpack which was stuffed with metal scraps to maximize  casualties. Police believe he boarded the bus in the Talpiot industrial zone.

The suicide bomber waited for the bus to fill up with passengers. At approximately 8:30 am, as the bus passed Liberty Bell park on the edge of Emek Refaim, the main street of the German Colony,  he detonated the explosive device.

Eight people were killed in the attack and more than 60 people were injured, 11 of whom were schoolchildren.

The perpetrators 
The al-Aqsa Martyrs Brigades claimed responsibility for the attack and stated that the attacker was 23-year-old Mohammed Zaul from the village of Husan in the West Bank. After the attack a video of the suicide bomber was released in which Zaul claimed he carried out the attack in revenge "for the massacre perpetrated by Israel against the Palestinians."

Official reactions
Israeli Foreign Minister Silvan Shalom condemned the attack, citing it as proof that the Israeli West Bank barrier was justified and imperative to prevent such incidents from recurring.

Palestinian National Authority Prime Minister Ahmed Qureia condemned the attack and stated that it gave Israel an excuse to continue building the West Bank barrier.

See also 
 Davidka Square bus bombing

References

External links 
 Suicide bombing of Egged bus no. 14A in Jerusalem - published at the Israeli Ministry of Foreign Affairs
 At least 8 die in Israel bus blast - published on USA Today on February 22, 2004
 Jerusalem suicide bomber kills eight  - published on the Jerusalem Post on February 23, 2004
 Jerusalem Suicide Blast Kills 8 - published on CBS News on February 23, 2004

Mass murder in 2004
Attacks on buses by Palestinian militant groups
Terrorist incidents in Jerusalem
Palestinian suicide bomber attacks against buses
Terrorist attacks attributed to Palestinian militant groups
2004 in Jerusalem
February 2004 events in Asia
Terrorist incidents in Jerusalem in the 2000s